This article lists various statistics related to Manchester City Football Club.

Club honours

Premier League/First Division (highest tier)
Winners (8): 1936–37, 1967–68, 2011–12, 2013–14, 2017–18, 2018–19, 2020–21, 2021–22
Runners-up (6): 1903–04, 1920–21, 1976–77, 2012–13, 2014–15, 2019–20
First Division/Second Division (second tier)
Winners (7, joint record): 1898–99, 1902–03, 1909–10, 1927–28, 1946–47, 1965–66, 2001–02
Runners-up (4): 1895–96, 1950–51, 1988–89, 1999–2000
Promoted third place (1): 1984–85
Second Division (third tier)
Promoted third place (1): 1998–99
FA Cup
Winners (6): 1903–04, 1933–34, 1955–56, 1968–69, 2010–11, 2018–19
Runners-up (5): 1925–26, 1932–33, 1954–55, 1980–81, 2012–13
EFL Cup/Football League Cup
Winners (8): 1969–70, 1975–76, 2013–14, 2015–16, 2017–18, 2018–19, 2019–20, 2020–21
Runners-up (1): 1973–74
Full Members' Cup
(Best) Runners-up (1): 1985–86
FA Community Shield/FA Charity Shield
Winners (6): 1937, 1968, 1972, 2012, 2018, 2019
Runners-up (8): 1934, 1956, 1969, 1973, 2011, 2014, 2021, 2022
UEFA Champions League/European Cup
(Best) Runners-up (1): 2020–21
Semi-finals (2): 2015–16, 2021–22
UEFA Europa League/UEFA Cup
(Best) Quarter-finals (2): 1978–79, 2008–09
European Cup Winners' Cup
Winners (1): 1969–70
Semi-finals (1): 1970–71

Competitive record

The table that follows is accurate as of the end of the 2021–22 season for all competitions. It excludes war competitions and league performances prior to City's joining the English football league in 1892.

Current first-team squad statistics

Ordered by squad number.Appearances include league and cup appearances, including as substitute.Includes EDS players who train regularly with the first team, having made at least one previous league appearance.

Club records

Matches
Record league victory – 11–3 v. Lincoln City (23 March 1895, most goals scored), 10–0 v. Darwen (18 February 1899, widest margin of victory)
Record FA Cup victory – 12–0 v. Liverpool Stanley (4 October 1890)
Record European victory – 7–0 v. Schalke 04, UEFA Champions League round of 16 second leg (12 March 2019), 7–0 v. RB Leipzig,  UEFA Champions League round of 16 second leg (14 March 2023)
Record league defeat – 0–8 v. Burton Wanderers (26 December 1894), 0–8 v. Wolverhampton Wanderers (23 December 1933), 1–9 v. Everton (3 September 1906), 2–10 v. Small Heath (17 March 1893)
Record FA Cup defeat – 0–6 v. Preston North End (30 January 1897), 2–8 v. Bradford Park Avenue (30 January 1946)
Record European defeat – 0–4 v Barcelona, UEFA Champions League group stage, 19 October 2016

Streaks

Winning runs
Longest winning run in all competitions: 21, 19 December 2020 – 2 March 2021 (all games won over 90 minutes) (national record)
Longest league winning run: 18, 26 August 2017 – 27 December 2017 (joint national record)
Longest league winning run from the start of a calendar year: 13, 3 January 2021 – 2 March 2021 (national record)
Longest run of games without going behind in the Premier League: 19, 28 November 2020 – 2 March 2021 (joint national record)
Longest winning run in the FA Cup: 10, 6 January 2019 – 28 June 2020
Longest winning run in the League Cup: 16, 20 September 2017 – 7 January 2020 (including penalty shoot-out wins)
Most home wins in a row (all competitions): 20, 9 September 2017 – 4 March 2018
Most away wins in a row (all competitions): 20, 19 December 2020 – 14 May 2021 (national record)
Most home wins in a row (league): 20, 5 March 2011 – 21 March 2012
Most away wins in a row (league): 12, 19 December 2020 – 14 May 2021 (national record)
Longest winning run in UEFA competitions: 7, 9 December 2020 – 4 May 2021 
Most home wins in a row (UEFA Champions League): 10, 7 August 2020 – 24 November 2021
Most UEFA Champions League wins in a single season: 11, in the 2020–21 season (national record)

Unbeaten runs
Longest unbeaten run (all competitions): 28, 27 April 2017 – 3 December 2017 and 25 November 2020 – 2 March 2021
Longest unbeaten away run (all competitions): 23, 25 November 2020 – 14 May 2021
Longest league unbeaten run: 30, 8 April 2017 – 2 January 2018
Longest league unbeaten away run: 22, 11 September 2021 – 17 September 2022
Longest unbeaten run in the UEFA Champions League: 12, 21 October 2020 – 28 April 2021
Longest unbeaten home run in the UEFA Champions League: 24, 7 November 2018 – 14 March 2023 (ongoing), (record by an English team)
Longest unbeaten away run in the UEFA Champions League: 10, 18 September 2019 – 28 April 2021

Winless runs
Longest winless run: 18, 26 December 1979 – 7 April 1980
Longest home winless run: 9, 26 December 1979 – 7 April 1980
Longest away winless run: 34, 11 February 1986 – 17 October 1987
Longest winless run in the UEFA Champions League: 6, 18 September 2012 – 4 December 2012

Draws
Most draws in a row: 6, 5 April 1913 – 6 September 1913
Most home draws in a row: 6, 18 October 1924 – 20 December 1924
Most away draws in a row: 7, 9 September 1990 – 24 November 1990
Most league draws in a row: 7, 5 October 2009 – 28 October 2009

Losses
Most defeats in a row: 8, 23 August 1995 – 14 October 1995
Most home defeats in a row: 5, 5 December 1987 – 23 January 1988
Most away defeats in a row: 14, 5 November 1892 – 13 January 1894

Seasonal
Records are only for completed league seasons and exclude war seasons.

Most
Most goals scored in a season (all competitions): 169, 2018–19 (national record)
Most league goals scored in a season: 108, 1926–27 and 2001–02
Most goals scored in a Premier League season: 106, 2017–18 (national record)
Most goals scored in a Premier League calendar year: 113, 2021 (national record)
Most league goals conceded in a season: 102, 1962–63
Most Premier League goals conceded in a season: 65, 2000–01
Most points in a league season (2 points per win): 62, 1946–47 Second Division
Most points in a league season (3 points per win): 100, 2017–18 Premier League (national record for highest level)
Most league wins in a season: 32, 2017–18 and 2018–19 (national record)
Most league wins in a calendar year: 36, 2021 (national record for highest level)
Most away league wins in a calendar year: 19, 2021 (national record for highest level)
Most home league wins in a season: 19, 1920–21 and 2001–02
Most away league wins in a season: 16, 2017–18
Most league draws in a season: 18, 1993–94
Most league defeats in a season: 22, 1958–59, 1959–60 and 1997–98
Most Premier League defeats in a season: 21, 2005–06

Least
Fewest league goals scored in a season: 29, 2006–07
Fewest league goals conceded in a season: 23, 2018–19
Fewest points in a league season (2 points per win): 18, 1892–93 Second Division
Fewest points in a league season (3 points per win): 34, 2000–01 Premier League
Fewest league wins in a season: 8, 1893–94, 1949–50, 1986–87 and 2000–01
Fewest league draws in a season: 2, 1893–94 and 2018–19
Fewest league defeats in a season: 2, 2017–18

Internationals
Most international caps (total while at club): 87 – David Silva, Spain
Most international goals (total while at club) 28 – David Silva, Spain

Attendances
Highest home attendance: 84,569 v Stoke City, Maine Road, FA Cup, 3 March 1934 (national record)

Penalty shoot-out record
Overall record

Individual shoot-outs

Player awards

Player of the Year

Each season since the end of the 1966–67 season, the members of the Manchester City Official Supporters Club have voted by ballot to choose the player on the team they feel is the worthiest of recognition for his performances during that season. The following table lists all of the recipients of this award since 2000.
Source:

Players with the most Player of the Year awards

Source:

Players' individual awards while playing with Manchester City

European or international award winners
 FIFA FIFPRO World 11 (6):
 Kevin De Bruyne in 2020, 2021, 2022
 Rúben Dias in 2021
 João Cancelo in 2022
 Erling Haaland in 2022
  UEFA Club Football Awards (2):
 Kevin De Bruyne in 2019–20 (Best Midfielder)
 Rúben Dias in 2020–21 (Best Defender)
  UEFA Team of the Year (3):
 Kevin De Bruyne in 2017, 2019, 2020
  IFFHS Men's World Team (8):
 Kevin De Bruyne in 2017, 2019, 2020, 2021, 2022
 Bernardo Silva in 2019
 Rúben Dias in 2021
 Erling Haaland in 2022
  IFFHS World's Best Playmaker (2):
 Kevin De Bruyne in 2020, 2021
 IFFHS World's Best Central Left Midfielder (1):
 Kevin De Bruyne in 2020
IFFHS UEFA Team of the Decade (1):
 Kevin De Bruyne for 2011–2020
IFFHS CONMEBOL Team of the Decade (1)
 Sergio Agüero for 2011–2020
IFFHS CAF Team of the Decade (2)
 Riyad Mahrez for 2011–2020
 Yaya Touré for 2011–2020
ESM Team of the Season (14)
 Kevin De Bruyne in 2017–18, 2019–20, 2020–21, 2021–22
 João Cancelo in 2020–21, 2021–22
 Vincent Kompany in 2011–12
 Yaya Touré in 2013–14
 Nicolás Otamendi and  David Silva in 2017–18
 Rúben Dias,  John Stones and  İlkay Gündoğan in 2020–21
 Bernardo Silva in 2021–22

First Division or Premier League awards winners
PFA Players' Player of the Year (2)
 Kevin De Bruyne in 2019–20 and 2020–21
 PFA Young Player of the Year (5)
 Peter Barnes in 1975–76
 Leroy Sané in 2017–18
 Raheem Sterling in 2018–19
 Phil Foden in 2020–21 and 2021–22
 Premier League Player of the Season (4)
 Vincent Kompany in 2011–12
 Kevin De Bruyne in 2019–20 and 2021–22
 Rúben Dias in 2020–21
Premier League Young Player of the Season (2)
 Phil Foden in 2020–21 and 2021–22
 FWA Footballer of the Year (5)
 Don Revie in 1954–55
 Bert Trautmann in 1955–56
 Tony Book in 1968–69
 Raheem Sterling in 2018–19
 Rúben Dias in 2020–21
 Premier League Golden Boot (4) (or previous First Division equivalent)
 Frank Roberts: 1 (31 goals, 1924–25)
 Francis Lee: 1 (33 goals, 1971–72)
 Carlos Tevez: 1 (20 goals, 2010–11)
 Sergio Agüero: 1 (26 goals, 2014–15)
 Premier League Playmaker of the Season (2)
 Kevin De Bruyne: 2 (16 assists, 2017–18; 20 assists, 2019–20)
 Premier League Golden Glove (7)
 Joe Hart: 4 (18 clean sheets, 2010–11; 17 clean sheets, 2011–12; 18 clean sheets, 2012–13; 14 clean sheets, 2014–15)
 Ederson: 3 (16 clean sheets, 2019–20; 19 clean sheets, 2020–21; 20 clean sheets, 2021–22
 Premier League Player of the Month  (Players with at least 2 awards won)
 Sergio Agüero: 7 (equal most in Premier League) (October 2013, November 2014, January 2016, April 2016, January 2018, February 2019, January 2020)
 Raheem Sterling: 3 (August 2016, November 2018, December 2021)
 İlkay Gündoğan: 2 (January 2021, February 2021)
 Premier League Goal of the Month  (Players with at least 2 awards won)
 Kevin De Bruyne: 2 (November 2019, July 2020)

Players with the most titles won at the club
As of 22 May 2021
Players with equal number of titles are ranked in alphabetical order

Player records

Appearances
Youngest player: Glyn Pardoe, 15 years, 314 days (against Birmingham City, First Division, 11 April 1962)
Oldest player: Billy Meredith, 49 years, 245 days (against Newcastle United, FA Cup semi-final, 29 March 1924)

All-time appearances
This table lists the top ten Manchester City players with the most appearances for the club (minimum 436 appearances).
Figures out of brackets are match starts and in brackets are additional substitute appearances. 
Columns are sorted and ranked in order of total (start + sub) appearances 
Names in bold are players who are still at the club at present.

Current player with the most appearances: Kevin De Bruyne – 290 (43) as of 23 January 2023 - ranked 30th in the all time list.

Appearances in continental competitions
As of match played 14 March 2023.

Goalscorers

All-time top goalscorers

As of 11 May 2022.

 Most goals scored in all competitions: 260 – Sergio Agüero (2011–21).
 Most goals scored in one season in all competitions: 42 – Erling Haaland (2022–23) (ongoing)
 Most consecutive matches scored in (all competitions): 10 – Erling Haaland, 21 August 2022 – 8 October 2022.
 Most matches scored in Manchester City history: 186 – Sergio Agüero (2011–21).
 Most braces in Manchester City history: 37 – Sergio Agüero (2011–21).
 Most hat-tricks scored for Manchester City: 16 – Sergio Agüero (2011–21).
 Most hat-tricks in one season: 6 – Erling Haaland (in 2022–23) (ongoing).
 Most goals scored in a match in any competition: 6 – Denis Law v Luton Town, 28 January 1961.
 Youngest goalscorer in all competitions: Rony Lopes scored 5 January 2013 vs Watford (in FA Cup 3rd round) aged 17 years 8 days

All-time top goalscorers in First Division / Premier League
As of 23 March 2021

 Most goals scored in First Division / Premier League: 184 – Sergio Agüero (2011–21) (most Premier League goals for a non-English player).
 Most goals scored in one First Division season: 38 – Tommy Johnson (1928–29).
 Most goals scored in one Premier League season: 28 – Erling Haaland (2022–23) (ongoing)
 Most consecutive Premier League matches scored in: 7 – Sergio Agüero (12 May 2019 – 21 September 2019) and Erling Haaland (21 August 2022 – 8 October 2022).
 Most home goals in one Premier League season: 18 – Erling Haaland (2022–23) (ongoing)
 Most away goals in one Premier League season: 13 – Sergio Agüero (2016–17).
 Most Premier League matches scored in while playing for Manchester City: 131 – Sergio Agüero (2011–21).
 Most Premier League matches scored in during a single season: 17 – Sergio Agüero (2014–15) and Erling Haaland (2022–23) (ongoing).
 Most home matches scored in one Premier League season: 11 – Sergio Agüero (2011–12).
 Most away matches scored in one Premier League season: 9 – Sergio Agüero (2015–16).
 Most braces scored in Premier League: 26 – Sergio Agüero (2011–21).
 Most Premier League braces in one season: 5 – Sergio Agüero (2016–17).
 Most hat-tricks scored in the Premier League: 12 – Sergio Agüero (2011–21) (national record).
 Most Premier League hat-tricks in one season: 4 – Erling Haaland (in 2022–23) (ongoing)
 Most poker or haul (4 goals in match) in Premier League games: 2 – Sergio Agüero (v. Tottenham Hotspur, 2014–15) and (v. Leicester City, 2017–18) .
 Most goals scored in one Premier League match: 5 – Sergio Agüero (v. Newcastle United, 2015–16).
 Most home goals scored in club history in Premier League: 109 – Sergio Agüero (2011–21).
 Most aways goals scored in club history in Premier League: 74 – Sergio Agüero (2011–21).
 Most penalties scored in Premier League: 27 – Sergio Agüero (2011–21).
 Youngest league goalscorer: Ian Thompstone - scored 9 April 1988 vs. Middlesbrough aged 17 years 83 days.
 Youngest Premier League goalscorer: Micah Richards - scored on 30 September 2006 vs. Everton aged 18 years 98 days.

All-time top goalscorers in continental competitions
As of 14 March 2023.
In this table "Others" refer to historical and defunct continental competitions such as the Cup Winners' Cup and Anglo-Italian Cup with no current equivalent competition.Goals scored in the old European Cup and UEFA Cup are included in the Champions League and Europa League columns respectively.

 Most goals scored in European competitions: 43 – Sergio Agüero
 Most goals scored in the UEFA Champions League: 39 – Sergio Agüero
 Most goals scored in the play-off round: 3 – Sergio Agüero
 Most goals scored in the group stage: 27 – Sergio Agüero
 Most goals scored in the knockout phase: 10 – Kevin De Bruyne
 Most goals scored in a single season:  10 – Erling Haaland (2022–23) (ongoing)
 Most hat-tricks scored: 3 – Sergio Agüero (2011–2021)
 Most hat-tricks in a single season: 2 – Sergio Agüero (in 2016–17)
 Most goals scored in a single match: 5 –  Erling Haaland (2022–23)
 Youngest scorer in European competitions: Tony Towers – scored on 18 March 1970 vs. Academica Coimbra (European Cup Winners Cup), aged 17 years 339 days
 Youngest scorer in the UEFA Champions League: Rico Lewis – scored on 2 November 2022 vs. Sevilla, aged 17 years 346 days

All-time top goalscorers in knockout phases of continental competitions
As of 14 March 2023.

Most goals scored in knockout phases: 13 – Sergio Agüero
Most goals scored in the UCL round of 16: 8 – Sergio Agüero
Most goals scored in the UCL quarter-finals: 5 – Kevin De Bruyne
Most goals scored in the UCL semi-finals: 4 – Riyad Mahrez

Hat-tricks in UEFA competitions
Statistics correct as of 14 March 2023.

All-time top goalscorers in English cup competitions
As of 20 March 2022

 Most goals scored in all domestic cup competitions: 33 – Sergio Agüero.
 Most goals scored in the FA Cup: 22 – Fred Tilson.
 Most FA Cup goals in a season: 9 – Frank Roberts (1925–26).
 Most FA Cup Final goals in total: 2 – Raheem Sterling and Gabriel Jesus (2018–19).
 Most goals scored in the League Cup: 18 – Colin Bell, Denis Tueart.
 Most League Cup goals in a season: 8 – Denis Tueart (1975–76).
 Most goals scored in one League Cup match: 4 – Gabriel Jesus (2018–19).
 Most League Cup Final goals in total: 2 – Sergio Agüero (2017–18 and 2019–20).
 Most goals scored in the Community Shield: 3 – Francis Lee (1968 and 1972).
 Youngest goalscorer in domestic cup competitions post 1946: Rony Lopes scored 5 January 2013 vs Watford (FA Cup) aged 17 years 8 days

Manchester City top goalscorers in a single season (all competitive matches)

This table lists players who have scored more than 30 goals in a single season. Ordered by goals scored and by season.
 Bold denotes an active player for the club.

Assists
Note: Assist data has only been recorded by the Premier League and Opta since 1992–93
Most assists in all competitions: 136 – Kevin De Bruyne
Most assists in Premier League: 98 – Kevin De Bruyne
Most assists in UEFA competitions: 23 – Kevin De Bruyne
Most assists in all competitions in one season: 23 – Kevin De Bruyne in 2019–20
Most assists in a Premier League season: 20 – Kevin De Bruyne in 2019–20 (shared national record)
Most assists in a Premier League match: 3 – Kevin De Bruyne (vs. Leicester City, 10 February 2018) and Leroy Sané (vs Brighton & Hove Albion, 9 May 2018)
Most assists in a UEFA competition season: 4 – Kevin De Bruyne, in the 2017–18, 2018–19 and 2020–21 UEFA Champions League and João Cancelo, in the 2022–23 Champions League.
Most assists in a UEFA competition match: 3 – Kevin De Bruyne (vs. Tottenham Hotspur, UEFA Champions League, 17 April 2019) and João Cancelo (vs. Club Brugge, UEFA Champions League, 3 November 2021)

Most assists in all competitions
Statistics correct as of 18 March 2023. Bold denotes an active player for the club.

Most assists in Premier League 
Statistics correct as of 15 February 2023. Bold denotes an active player for the club.

Most assists in UEFA competitions
Statistics correct as of 14 March 2023. Bold denotes an active player for the club.

Clean sheets
Most clean sheets in one season: 33 in 61 matches, 2018–19
Most clean sheets by an individual goalkeeper in one season: 29, Joe Hart, 2010–11
Most clean sheets by an individual goalkeeper: 185, Joe Corrigan (1967–1983)
Most Premier League Golden Glove awards: 4, Joe Hart
Most consecutive Premier League Golden Glove awards: 3, Joe Hart (2010–11, 2011–12, 2012–13), Ederson (2019–20, 2020–21, 2021–22)
Most clean sheets overall in the Premier League: 109, Joe Hart (2006–2017)
Most Premier League clean sheets by an individual goalkeeper in one season: 20, Ederson, 2018–19 (38 matches) and 2021–22 (37 matches)
Most clean sheets overall in the UEFA Champions League: 24, Ederson (2017–)
Most consecutive clean sheets in the UEFA Champions League: 7, 27 October 2020 – 16 March 2021
Most consecutive clean sheets in all competitions during a season: 6, 25 November 2020 – 12 December 2020
Most consecutive league clean sheets during a season: 6, 15 September 2018 – 29 October 2018 and 13 January 2021 – 3 February 2021
Longest run without a clean sheet: 14 matches, 15 December 2004 – 9 April 2005

Most clean sheets in all competitions
Statistics correct as of 14 March 2023. Bold denotes an active player for the club.

Captaincy

Club captains

Note: Other players (vice-captains) have led the team on the pitch when the club captain is not playing. Other players have been made captain on a one off basis to celebrate or commemorate an event. E.g. Oleksandr Zinchenko captained the team in their 2021–22 FA Cup fifth-round tie at Peterborough United in support of his opposition to the Russian invasion of Ukraine.

Total number of club captains: 37 players
Longest serving captains: 8 seasons, 
 Lot Jones (1906–1914), 
 Vincent Kompany (2011–2019)

Shortest serving captains: 1 season, 13 players

Club captains since 2000

Transfers
Many transfers have undisclosed fees, and thus transfer fees are not accurate. Where players have signed/left on undisclosed fees, a reference is given for the estimated transfer fee from a reputable source.

Highest transfer fees paid

Highest transfer fees received

Progression of record transfer fee paid

Managerial records

 First full-time manager:  Frederick Hopkinson
 Most years as manager: 13 years –  Les McDowall (1950–1963)
 Most titles won as manager: 11 –  Pep Guardiola
 Most matches managed: 592 –  Les McDowall
 Most matches won as manager: 286 –  Pep Guardiola 
 Most goals scored under manager: 1,049 –  Les McDowall
 Highest win percentage (at least one season in charge): 72.5% –  Pep Guardiola (2016–present)
 Lowest win percentage (at least one season in charge): 25.0% –  Malcolm Allison (1979–1980)

Managers individual awards
 Premier League Manager of the Season (3)
 Pep Guardiola (3): 2017–18, 2018–19, 2020–21
 League Managers Association Awards (2)
 Pep Guardiola (2): 2018, 2021
 Premier League Manager of the Month  (Managers with at least 2 awards won)
 Pep Guardiola (11): February 2017, September 2017, October 2017, November 2017, December 2017, February 2019, April 2019, January 2021, February 2021, November 2021, December 2021)
 Manuel Pellegrini (4): December 2013, January 2014, December 2014, August 2015
 Roberto Mancini (2): December 2010, October 2011
 Stuart Pearce (2): April 2005, August 2005

International representatives
The following players represented their countries while playing for Manchester City. Many of these players also gained caps/goals while at other clubs. It excludes caps/goals earned by players while on loan from City to other clubs.  Figures for active players in boldLast updated 18 December 2022

International honours won while playing at City

FIFA World Cup
The following players have won the FIFA World Cup while playing for Manchester City:
 Benjamin Mendy – 2018
 Julián Álvarez – 2022

FIFA Confederations Cup
The following players have won the FIFA Confederations Cup while playing for Manchester City:
 Elano, Robinho – 2009
 Leroy Sané – 2017

UEFA European Championship
The following players have won the UEFA European Championship while playing for Manchester City:
 David Silva – 2012

UEFA Nations League
The following players have won the UEFA Nations League while playing for Manchester City:
 Bernardo Silva – 2019

Copa América
The following players have won the Copa América while playing for Manchester City:
 Gabriel Jesus, Fernandinho, Ederson – 2019
 Sergio Agüero – 2021

Africa Cup of Nations
The following players have won the Africa Cup of Nations while playing for Manchester City:
 Lucien Mettomo – 2002
 Yaya Touré, Wilfried Bony – 2015
 Riyad Mahrez – 2019

CONCACAF Nations League
The following players have won the CONCACAF Nations League while playing for Manchester City:
 Zack Steffen – 2021

OFC Nations Cup
The following players have won the OFC Nations Cup while playing for Manchester City:
 Danny Tiatto – 2000

International caps
The figure in brackets is the number of international caps gained while a Manchester City player. It excludes caps earned by players while on loan from City to other clubs. Players are listed in alphabetical order by country and by name.

Sources (where not otherwise indicated): for UEFA nations for other nations

Algeria
Djamel Belmadi (1)
Riyad Mahrez (39)

Argentina
Sergio Agüero (69) 
Julián Álvarez (9) 
Martín Demichelis (13) 
Nicolás Otamendi (55) 
Carlos Tevez (15) 
Pablo Zabaleta (52) 

Australia
Danny Tiatto (16) 

Belgium
Dedryck Boyata (1)
Kevin De Bruyne (63) 
Geert De Vlieger* (1) 
Vincent Kompany (66)
Émile Mpenza (2) 

Bermuda
Shaun Goater (1) 

Bosnia and Herzegovina
Edin Džeko (41) 

Brazil
Danilo (6)
Ederson (19)
Elano (19) 
Fernandinho (47) 
Gabriel Jesus (56) 
Jô (2)
Robinho (25)

Bulgaria
Valeri Bojinov (1) 
Martin Petrov (17) 

Cameroon
Marc-Vivien Foé (4) 
Lucien Mettomo (14)

Chile
Claudio Bravo (17) 

China
Sun Jihai (27) 

Costa Rica
Paulo Wanchope (24) 

Croatia
Vedran Ćorluka (16) 

Denmark
Niclas Jensen (17) 

Ecuador
Felipe Caicedo (16) 

England 
Billy Austin (1)
Sam Barkas (5)
Peter Barnes (14)
Gareth Barry (23) 
Joey Barton (1)
Colin Bell (48)
Frank Booth (1)
Jackie Bray (6)
Wayne Bridge (4)
Ivor Broadis (8)
Eric Brook (18)
Herbert Burgess (4)
Mick Channon (1)
Joe Corrigan (9)
Sam Cowan (3)
Keith Curle (3) 
Fabian Delph (14) 
Mike Doyle (5)
Phil Foden (22) 
Trevor Francis (10)
Jack Grealish (17) 
Joe Hart (63) 

England (continued)
David James (13)
Adam Johnson (12)
Tommy Johnson (2)
Francis Lee (27)
Joleon Lescott (19) 
Rodney Marsh (8)
Jimmy Meadows (1)
James Milner (42) 
James Mitchell (1)
Kalvin Phillips (2)
Kevin Reeves (1) 
Don Revie (6)
Micah Richards (13)
Frank Roberts (4)
Jack Rodwell (1) 
Joe Royle (6) 
Trevor Sinclair (1) 
Bert Sproston (1) 
Raheem Sterling (61) 
John Stones (54) 
Mike Summerbee (8) 
Frank Swift (19) 
Irvine Thornley (1) 
Fred Tilson (4) 
Dennis Tueart (6) 
Kyle Walker (46) 
David Watson (27) 
David White (1) 
Max Woosnam (1) 
Shaun Wright-Phillips (21) 

Faroe Islands
Gunnar Nielsen (6)

Finland
Tuomas Haapala* (2)

France
Gaël Clichy (10) 
Eliaquim Mangala (5) 
Benjamin Mendy (6) 
Samir Nasri (18) 
Bacary Sagna (23) 

Georgia
Mikhail Kavelashvili (4) 
Georgi Kinkladze (13) 
Murtaz Shelia (4) 
Kakhaber Tskhadadze (2) 

Germany
Jérôme Boateng (3) 
İlkay Gündoğan (49) 
Leroy Sané (17) 

Greece
Georgios Samaras (14) 

Iceland
Árni Gautur Arason (4)

Ireland and Republic of Ireland
Gavin Bazunu* (2) 
Jimmy Conway (1)
Greg Cunningham (2)
Peter Doherty (6)
Richard Dunne (47) 
Jimmy Elwood (1)
Paddy Fagan (2)
Shay Given (22)
Mickey Hamill (1)
Stephen Ireland (6) 
Paddy Kelly (1)
Mark Kennedy (9) 
Alan Kernaghan (15) 
Jon Macken (1)
Mick McCarthy (20) 
Keiller McCullough (3)
Jimmy Mulligan (1)
Terry Phelan (19) 
Niall Quinn (47) 
Billy Walsh (9) 

Israel
Tal Ben Haim (7) 
Eyal Berkovic (6)

Italy
Mario Balotelli (15)

Ivory Coast
Wilfried Bony (12) 
Abdul Razak (5)
Kolo Touré (20) 
Yaya Touré (26) 

Kosova
Bersant Celina (3) 
Arijanet Muric (6) 

Mexico
Nery Castillo (1) 

Montenegro
Stevan Jovetić (10) 
Stefan Savić (9) 

Netherlands
Nathan Aké (21)
Paul Bosvelt (6) 
Nigel de Jong (34)

New Zealand
Chris Killen (18) 

Nigeria
Kelechi Iheanacho (10) 

Northern Ireland
Shea Charles* (4) 
Johnny Crossan (10)
Gary Fleming (2)
Kevin Horlock (27)
Michael Hughes (4)
Steve Lomas (18)
Billy McAdams (5)
Frank McCourt (6) 
Ryan McGivern* (7) 
Sammy McIlroy (10)
Martin O'Neill(1)
Jeff Whitley (7)
Jim Whitley (3)
Tommy Wright (5) 
Billy Walsh (5) 

Norway
Alfie Haaland (1) 
Erling Haaland (2) 
Age Hareide (7) 
Abdisalam Ibrahim* (2) 
Kåre Ingebrigtsen (2) 

Paraguay
Roque Santa Cruz (19) 

Portugal
João Cancelo (27) 
Rúben Dias (23) 
Bernardo Silva (61) 

Romania
Costel Pantilimon (5) 

Scotland
Matt Busby (1)
Paul Dickov (3)
Willie Donachie (35)
Asa Hartford (36)
Bobby Johnstone (4)
Denis Law (11)
George Livingstone (1)
Jimmy McLuckie (1)
Jimmy McMullan (8)
Jackie Plenderleith (1)
George Stewart (2)

Serbia
Aleksandar Kolarov (53) 
Matija Nastasić (15) 

Slovakia
Vladimír Weiss (6) 

Spain
Eric García (10) 
Javi García (1) 
Aymeric Laporte (17) 
Jesús Navas (7) 
Álvaro Negredo (7)
Nolito (3) 
Rodri (30)
David Silva (87) 
Ferran Torres (22) 

Sweden
John Guidetti (2)
Andreas Isaksson (17) 

Switzerland
Manuel Akanji (4) 
Gelson Fernandes (17) 

Thailand
Teerasil Dangda* (1) 
Kiatprawut Saiwaeo* (1)
Suree Sukha* (1)

Togo
Emmanuel Adebayor (5) 

Ukraine
Oleksandr Zinchenko (41) 

United States
DaMarcus Beasley (1) 
Claudio Reyna (20) 
Zack Steffen (10)

Wales
Craig Bellamy (5) 
Tommy Chapman (1) 
Roy Clarke (22)
Gordon Davies (2) 
Joe Davies (1) 
Wyn Davies (3)
Andy Dibble (1)
Ched Evans (10) 
Bert Gray (5) 
Edwin Hughes (1) 
Emyr Huws* (1) 
Di Jones (2)
Lot Jones (18)
Billy Lewis (2)
Billy Meredith (22)
Rabbi Matondo* (1) 
Hugh Morris (1)
Roy Paul (24)
David Phillips (10) 
Cliff Sear (1)
Matt Smith* (5)
Kit Symons (9) 
Ben Thatcher (4) 
George Wynn (8)

Zimbabwe
Benjani (1) 

*Players with no first team appearances.

Most international goals
Players are listed in order of goals scored and by alphabetical order

Notes

References
 General

 Specific

External links
 Extensive Manchester City statistics site

Manchester City
Records and Statistics